Konia may refer to:

 Kōnia (1808–1857), Hawaiian high chiefess
 Konia (fish), a cichlid genus containing the Dikume (K. dikume) and the Konye (K. eisentrauti)
 Konia, Guinea
 Konia, Paphos, a village in Cyprus

See also
 Konya (disambiguation),